Horst Köhler (born 14 November 1938) is a German equestrian. He competed at the 1968 Summer Olympics and the 1972 Summer Olympics.

References

External links
 

1938 births
Living people
German male equestrians
Olympic equestrians of East Germany
Equestrians at the 1968 Summer Olympics
Equestrians at the 1972 Summer Olympics
Sportspeople from Mecklenburg-Western Pomerania